Liesel Dorothy (born 16 January 1984) is a South African former field hockey player who competed in the 2004 Summer Olympics.

References

External links

1984 births
Living people
South African female field hockey players
Olympic field hockey players of South Africa
Field hockey players at the 2004 Summer Olympics
Field hockey players at the 2006 Commonwealth Games
Commonwealth Games competitors for South Africa
Competitors at the 2003 All-Africa Games
African Games competitors for South Africa